Fame is an American musical drama television series which premiered on NBC on January 7, 1982. The series is based on the 1980 film of the same name. In 1983, the series entered syndication, for which it remained until its conclusion in 1987. Six seasons and 136 episodes have been aired.

The series is available on DVD. Season One was released by Sony Pictures Home Entertainment on November 1, 2005 and is now out of print. 20th Century Fox Home Entertainment acquired the rights to release the series under license from MGM and released Seasons One & Two in a box set on September 15, 2009. Both releases were made available as individual sets on January 12, 2010 via 20th Century Fox. As of yet, there have been no plans to release the remaining seasons.

The following are a list of episodes.

Series overview

Episodes

Season 1 (1982)

Season 2 (1982–83)

Season 3 (1983–84)

Season 4 (1984–85)

Season 5 (1985–86)

Season 6 (1986–87)

U.S. television ratings

See also
Fame Looks At Music '83

References

External links
Fame TV Series Archive

Fame (1982 TV series) episodes, List of
Fame (franchise)